In the 2013–14 season, MC Alger competed in Ligue 1 for the 43rd season, as well as the Algerian Cup. It was their 11th consecutive season in the top flight of Algerian football. They remained in Ligue 1, and went on to win the Algerian Cup. Because of the events of the Algerian Cup final last season club president Omar Gharib was given a life ban, Faouzi Chaouchi and Réda Babouche two years and coach Djamel Menad one year.

Squad list
Players and squad numbers last updated on 18 November 2010.Note: Flags indicate national team as has been defined under FIFA eligibility rules. Players may hold more than one non-FIFA nationality.

Competitions

Overview

{| class="wikitable" style="text-align: center"
|-
!rowspan=2|Competition
!colspan=8|Record
!rowspan=2|Started round
!rowspan=2|Final position / round
!rowspan=2|First match	
!rowspan=2|Last match
|-
!
!
!
!
!
!
!
!
|-
| Ligue 1

|  
| 6th
| 24 August 2013
| 22 May 2014
|-
| Algerian Cup

| Round of 64 
| style="background:gold;"| Winner
| 6 December 2013
| 1 May 2014
|-
! Total

Ligue 1

League table

Results summary

Results by round

Matches

Algerian Cup

Squad information

Playing statistics

|-

|-
! colspan=10 style=background:#dcdcdc; text-align:center| Players transferred out during the season

Goalscorers

Transfers

In

Out

References

External links
 2013–14 MC Alger season at dzfoot.com 

MC Alger seasons
Algerian football clubs 2013–14 season